Mauro Zinetti (born 26 June 1975 in Gazzaniga) is an Italian former road cyclist, who was professional from 1998 to 2004.

Major results

1997
 1st Trofeo Alcide Degasperi
 1st Trofeo Papà Cervi
 3rd Overall Tour de Hokkaido
1st Stage 4
1998
 1st La Côte Picarde
1999
 1st Stage 3 Regio-Tour
 1st Stage 6 Hessen Rundfahrt
2000
 3rd G.P. Costa degli Etruschi
 9th Giro di Romagna
2002
 4th Grand Prix Pino Cerami
 7th Scheldeprijs
2003
 1st Stage 1 Course Cycliste de Solidarnosc et des Champions Olympiques
2004
 2nd Giro della Provincia di Reggio Calabria
 6th GP Chiasso

References

1975 births
Living people
Italian male cyclists
Cyclists from the Province of Bergamo
People from Gazzaniga